Pakistan ka matlab kya, La Illaha Illal Allah. ( — ; lit. What does Pakistan mean?... There is no God but Allah) was a couplet and political slogan coined in 1943 by Urdu poet Asghar Sodai.

The slogan became a battle cry and greeting for the Muslim League, which was struggling for an independent country for the Muslims of South Asia, when World War II ended and the independence movement geared up. This slogan shows the religious identity of Pakistan too. Today mostly Pakistani religious parties uses this slogan in their rallies.

See also 
 Pakistan Zindabad

References 

Pakistani nationalism
Political terminology in Pakistan
Urdu-language words and phrases
Pakistani political slogans
Battle cries